The Lützel is a tributary of the Birs in Switzerland and France. It flows into the Birs near Laufen. For 12 km, it forms the border between Switzerland and France.

Tributaries 
 Ruisseau de Bavelier (right)
 Bösenbach (right)

References

External links 

Rivers of Grand Est
Rivers of the canton of Jura
Rivers of the canton of Solothurn
Rivers of Haut-Rhin
Rivers of Switzerland
Rivers of France